Amir Kabir dam, also known as Karaj dam, is a dam on the Karaj River in the Central Alborz mountain range of northern Iran.

The Dam was constructed on the Karaj River, and was the first multi-purpose dam in Iran.

Construction
The initial studies for Amir Kabir Dam took 22 years until 1956 when formal proceedings began and the dam was constructed in the period from 1957 to 1961 by Morrison-Knudsen Co. From 1950 Khalil Taleghani took part in the construction process. 

Varian village was originally located on the bed of the Amir Kabir Dam and beside the Karaj River. Following the dam's construction, the village was relocated to higher grounds. This made the village only accessible by waterway.

Specifications 
The average annual water inflow to its reservoir is 472 million cubic meters. The total capacity of the dam's reservoir is 202 million cubic meters.

Purpose 
The Amir kabir Dam was built as a multi-purpose dam to provide tap water for Tehran alongside agricultural development in Karaj. The power plant has been connected to the national electricity network for over 46 years and has a capacity of 90 megawatts. The lake behind the dam is a touristic attraction while being a natural habitat for rainbow trout. With its sailing and water-skiing facilities, the dam is a popular weekend summer resort.

Gallery

See also 

Albert Lamorisse

References

External links
 Tishineh.com: Photos of Amir Kabir Dam، 

Dams in Alborz Province
Alborz (mountain range)
Hydroelectric power stations in Iran
Reservoirs in Iran
Dams completed in 1961
1961 establishments in Iran